Carl Schlieper was a German hardware manufacturing business established in Remscheid,  Germany in the 18th century. Products produced by the company include tools, steel safes, locks, charcoal, heavy machinery, bathroom fixtures, and coffee grinders.  After World War II the business was scaled down to focus on cutlery.

The company operated in the Dutch East Indies and had pavilion at the Colonial Exhibition of Semarang in 1914. The company also operated in Batavia, Dutch East Indies, including as a supplier of hardware for the Engineering Corps. The company is known for its "Eye Brand" knives.

History
Carl Schlieper Stahlwarenfabrik & Export was originally a trading company started in 1754 or 1798 and was based in Remscheid Germany. Products included knives, tools and straight razors. Markets included the booming tobacco and rubber plantation industry in Siam (Thailand), Malaysia, British North Borneo and the Dutch East Indies. A subsidiary of the company in Solingen dealt in knives including slipjoints, automatic knives, gardener, dagger, hunt measurer, machete, bowie, razors, and kitchen knives. Various brand names have been used and 22 patents held by the company. In the U.S. brand names have included "Fan", "Jim Bowie" and "El Gallo" and, after World War II, the "eye brand". In 1989 Schlieper merged with Remscheider. Carl Schlieper was liquidated in bankruptcy in 1993. Production of the brand was resumed by Freidrich Olbertz in Solingen.

References

Manufacturing companies of Germany
Companies based in North Rhine-Westphalia
German companies disestablished in 1993
Manufacturing companies disestablished in 1993